The Rose Experience is the fourth studio album by American R&B singer Case. It was released by Indigo Blue Music on March 24, 2009, marking his debut with the independent label following his departure from Def Jam Recordings.  "Lovely" was released as the album's first single.

Critical reception
Allmusic editor Paula Carino wrote that "when he hits his vocal stride, no one is smoother than Case. This 2009 release highlights the singer's sweet high register and ultra-romantic lyrics ("Be That Man"), and the songs are a little more reflective and mature than previous efforts, indicating a real heart and soul behind the voice."

Track listing

Charts

References

2009 albums
Case (singer) albums
Albums produced by Tim & Bob